Jessica Rosemary Shepherd FLS (born October 1984) is a painter, artist, publisher and botanist who works under the names of Úrsula Romero and Inky Leaves.

Early career
After attending Steyning Grammar School, Shepherd studied for a BSc in botany at Plymouth University and was awarded the Eden Project Prize for her thesis in which she initiated the restoration of Plymouth's historic Drakes Place Gardens. During her time at university Shepherd dedicated time to researching and cataloguing the 19th Century Thomas Bruges Flower (1817–1899) herbarium at Plymouth City Museum and Art Gallery alongside her studies.

After graduating from Plymouth University, she secured a NERC funded grant to study for a MSc in Botanical Taxonomy at University of Edinburgh and graduated with a distinction after studying the Cytology of Campanula rotundifolia for her thesis.

Following her attendance at Edinburgh Shepherd was funded by the Esmée Fairbairn Foundation to conduct two years of research into the 18th Century St. Aubyn (1758–1839) herbarium and mineral collection at Plymouth City Museum. Meanwhile she was also employed by the University to continue her work on improving the campus and was the curator of the Muirhead Herbarium.

In 2010 Shepherd was employed by the Royal Botanic Gardens, Kew and was positioned in the Shirley Sherwood Gallery of Botanical Art. During this time she freelanced as an illustrator for scientific journals and books whilst developing her own painting techniques and delivered several talks about the Marianne North Gallery.

She was elected Fellow of the Linnean Society of London in 2012 and was elected as a member of the Chelsea Physic Garden Florilegium Society in 2013 and a member of the Chelsea Arts Club in 2017.

Career
Shepherd's paintings feature in the Shirley Sherwood Collection, the Fitzwilliam Museum and National Botanic Gardens (Ireland). Her work has been featured in a number of exhibitions. In 2014, she was featured on the BBC4 documentary "In Search of Rory McEwen" where she demonstrated how to paint on vellum in the Chelsea Physic Garden.

On 16 February 2017 Shepherd held her first solo exhibition at Abbott and Holder in London and in conjunction published her first book titled ‘Leafscape’ featuring her collection of watercolour paintings on leaves. For the collection, Shepherd worked in collaboration with musician Hoodlum Priest (Derek Thompson) to produce a soundtrack which was released by Concrete Music Publishing.

In late 2017, inspired by Novalis' unfinished Bildungsroman 'Heinrich von Ofterdingen', Shepherd began her next project on the Blue Flower. In 2018 Shepherd launched INK Quarterly (INKQ) – a collaborative art publication that acts as a stage for thinkers and artists to talk freely about their ideas and practice for an educated audience. 2018 also saw the birth of the Inky Leaves podcasting channel which, via a series of talks and interviews, discusses and promotes botanical art.

Personal life
Shepherd was a model and muse for well known ceramic artist, printmaker and painter Eric James Mellon between 2004 and 2006, frequently appearing in his work wearing hats.

Exhibitions
 May 2021 - 'The Botanical Rainbow', Shirley Sherwood Gallery of Botanical Art, Royal Botanic Gardens Kew, London, UK
 August 2019 -  TV show and art festival, Granada, Spain
 July 2019 - The Long Gallery, Salamanca Arts Centre, Hobart, Tasmania, Australia
 May 2019 - Nazari Garden, group exhibition with painters Gareth Lister and Nick Fudge, Spain
 October 2017 – International Watercolour Festival, Moscow, Russia
 February 2017 – Leafscape, Abbott and Holder, London, UK
 July 2015 – The Incredible Exploding Pomegranate, Granada, Spain
 May 2014 – Aibítir, Dublin, Ireland
 April 2014 - RHS Botanical Art Show, London, UK
 May 2013 – Natural Selection, Espacio Gallery, London, UK
 April 2009 – Darwin to Digital, Cube³ Gallery, Plymouth, UK

Sound 
 Thompson, D. and Shepherd, J. R. (2017) Leafscape [CD], Concrete Music Publishing, UK

Publications 
 Shepherd, J. R. (2017) Leafscape [Hardback], Inky Leaves Publishing, Chichester, UK.

Illustrations by Shepherd 
 Patel Ellis, S. (2018) The Botanical Bible, William Collins-Harper. London, UK. pp. 320–321. 
 Wendell, B. (2018) 	L’unico mondo che abbiamo, Piano B edizioni, Prato, Italy.  (front cover)
 Morris, H. (2013) Tree Pruning: A Modern Approach, International Dendrology Society Yearbook, pp. 209–229
 Thurstan, M. and Martin, R. (2012) Exotic Botanical Illustration with the Eden Project, Batsford Ltd. 
 Morris, H. (2011) Tree Pruning: A Short History, International Dendrology Society Yearbook 2010, pp. 217–225

Essays 
 Shepherd, J. R. (2018) INK Quarterly, Inky Leaves Publishing (editorial)
 Shepherd, J. R. (2009) Bringing a Herbarium to Life at Plymouth City Museum and Art Gallery, 	NatSCA News, Issue 17, pp. 43–51
 Shepherd, J. R. (2009) The Collector, Geoscientist, Vol. 19, No. 12, pp. 6–9 	 	
 Shepherd, J. R. (2009) St. Aubyn Mineral Collection (c 1794–2010) at Plymouth City Museum and Art Gallery, Geological Curators Group Journal, Vol.9, No. 2, pp. 45–56

References

External links 
Official Inky Leaves website

Botanical illustrators
1984 births
21st-century British painters
English women painters
21st-century British women artists
Living people
20th-century English women
20th-century English people
21st-century English women
21st-century English people
British women curators